Domenico Riccio (also known as commonly known as Domenico Brusasorci; 1516–1567) was an Italian painter in a Mannerist style from Verona, best known for frescos.

He first apprenticed with his father. Later, he has been reported to have trained with Giovanni Francesco Caroto and Niccolò Giolfino. He was a near contemporary of Antonio Badile. By 1551, he completed the fresco decorations of the Municipio in Trento. In 1556, he painted a decoration in Palazzo Vescovile at Verona.  He depicted the ceremonial Cavalcade of Charles V and Clement VII in the Palazzo Ridolfi-Dalisca. He painted a Madonna in glory and two saints for San Pietro Martire in Verona in 1566. A notable work of his is the dramatic fresco of Phaeton on the ceiling of the Palazzo Chiericati.

His pupils were his son Felice, Giovanni Battista Zelotti, Bernardino India, and Paolo Farinati. His son Felice painted for some years in Florence. Two other children were painters: Giovanni Battista and Cecilia Brusasorci.

The name "Brusasorci," which means "rat burner," comes from his father, who acquired the name after becoming known for burning the rats in his house.

References

 Grove encyclopedia site on Artnet

1516 births
1567 deaths
16th-century Italian painters
Italian male painters
Painters from Verona
Italian Mannerist painters